APCC may refer to:

 American Potash and Chemical Company, American chemical manufacturer
 APCC, former Nasdaq symbol for APC by Schneider Electric, an American manufacturer
 APEC Climate Center, the Climate Centre for the Asia-Pacific Economic Cooperation
 Asia Pop Comic Convention, an annual comic book fan convention in Metro Manila, Philippines
 Asian and Pacific Coconut Community, an intergovernmental organization of coconut producing nations
 Assam Pradesh Congress Committee, a branch of the Indian National Congress political party in Assam,  India
 Association of Police and Crime Commissioners, a group of elected officials in England and Wales